The Norfolk Southern Railway Ohio River crossing connects South Point, Ohio with Kenova, West Virginia.

Trivia
The bridge is featured prominently in the Warner Bros. film We Are Marshall in a scene in which Jack Lengyel (played by Matthew McConaughey) visits William "Red" Dawson (played by Matthew Fox) at his home.  The scene was filmed at a private residence on Barger Hill in Kenova, which overlooks the town and the three states converging at the confluence of the Ohio and Big Sandy Rivers. The bridge can be seen in the background.

In the scene Lengyel makes reference to the train crossing it and uses it as an analogy for putting one's life back on track.

On March 4, 2013, Norfolk Southern noted the 100th anniversary of the bridge.

See also
List of crossings of the Ohio River

References

External links
 Norfolk Southern Bridge at Bridges & Tunnels.

Railroad bridges in West Virginia
Railroad bridges in Ohio
Bridges over the Ohio River
Transportation in Lawrence County, Ohio
Transportation in Wayne County, West Virginia
Norfolk Southern Railway bridges
Norfolk and Western Railway